Innocence is a 1923 American silent drama film directed by Edward J. Le Saint and starring Anna Q. Nilsson. The film was produced and distributed by Columbia Pictures (then known as CBC Film Sales).

Plot
As described in a film magazine review, theater actress Fay Leslie weds Don Hampton, a wealthy society man. Don becomes jealous of Paul Atkins, an actor friend of Fay. Paul is convicted of a robbery of which he is innocent. He escapes from a prison work gang and, after fighting with the crew of a train, makes a daring jump from the train while it is crossing a high trestle bridge, diving into a swift flowing river. In the end he is aided by Fay. Because of compromising circumstances, Don believes that she has been faithless and employs a lawyer to seek a divorce. Fay visits the attorney and, through her clever acting, convinces him that she is guiltless and that circumstantial evidence should not be credited. After Paul clears her name, husband and wife are reconciled.

Cast

Preservation
With no prints of Innocence located in any film archives, it is a lost film.

References

External links

Still at www.alamy.com

1923 films
American silent feature films
Films directed by Edward LeSaint
American black-and-white films
Silent American drama films
Lost American films
1923 drama films
Columbia Pictures films
1923 lost films
Lost drama films
1920s American films